The Silent Revolution may refer to:
 The Silent Revolution (1977), a book and a sociological concept by Ronald Inglehart
 The Silent Revolution (1972 film), documentary
 The Silent Revolution (2018 film), German film